Mike Tyson vs. Buster Mathis Jr., billed as Presumption of Innocence, was a professional boxing match contested on December 16, 1995.

Background
Mike Tyson had returned to boxing after a three-year prison stint with an 89-second victory over Peter McNeeley. After his victory, Tyson's rank as the number one ranked heavyweight was restored by the three major boxing organizations (the WBA, WBC and International Boxing Federation). Before he would fight for one of the three World Heavyweight titles, he would first partake in second comeback fight. Only days after his victory over McNeeley, it was announced that he would face the undefeated but virtually unknown Buster Mathis Jr. on November 4, 1995 at the MGM Grand Arena. The bout was originally scheduled to go up against the highly anticipated rubber match between Riddick Bowe and Evander Holyfield on pay-per-view, with Tyson–Mathis to be aired on Showtime, while Bowe–Holyfield would be broadcast on rival HBO. However, on September 14, Tyson promoter Don King would stun the boxing world by announcing that the Tyson–Mathis match would instead be broadcast for free on Fox. Three weeks before the fight, Tyson suffered a broken thumb, but did not announce it until November 1, three days before the fight. In a press conference at the MGM Grand, Tyson announced the cancellation of the fight because of the injury. Then, on November 22, it was announced that the bout had been moved to Atlantic City with a December 16 date in place and that Showtime would air the fight instead of Fox. Plans were changed after New Jersey gaming authorities ruled against having the fight in Atlantic City because Don King had been under suspension in New Jersey since 1994 because of legal troubles. On November 30, Philadelphia's CoreStates Spectrum was announced to host the fight with Fox regaining the rights to air it.

The fight
Tyson had a slow start in the fight. In the first round, Tyson was unable to land many punches as Mathis was able to dodge most of Tyson's attempts while also staying close to Tyson to prevent Tyson from unloading his power punches. In the second round Mathis successfully continued to use his defensive strategy of slipping, bobbing and clinching to survive the round. However, with about 40 seconds left in round 3, Tyson was able to land successive right uppercuts that dropped Mathis to the canvas. Mathis was unable to answer the referee's 10 count and Tyson was awarded the victory via knockout.

Aftermath
After his victory over Mathis, Tyson's promoter officially announced that he would receive his first Heavyweight title fight against WBC Heavyweight Champion Frank Bruno in March 1996. Tyson and Bruno had previously met in 1989 with Tyson's Undisputed Heavyweight Championship on the line. In that fight, Bruno rocked Tyson for the first time in Tyson's career with a left hook towards the end of the first round. Tyson recovered and otherwise dominated the fight before knocking Bruno out in the fifth round. In the 1996 rematch, Tyson again dominated Bruno, this time knocking him out in the third round to capture the WBC Heavyweight title.

Undercard
Tony Tucker lost a 10-round decision to Henry Akinwande.
Julio Cesar Vasquez knocked out Carl Daniels in round 11 to win the WBA Junior Middleweight Championship.
Terry Norris beat Paul Vaden by unanimous decision to win the WBC Junior Middleweight Championship.

References

1995 in boxing
Boxing in Philadelphia
Sports in Philadelphia
1995 in sports in Pennsylvania
Mathis
Fox Sports
December 1995 sports events in the United States
Mike Tyson